Cassinia accipitrum is a species of flowering plant in the family Asteraceae and is endemic to eastern New South Wales. It is an erect shrub with spreading, dark green leaves that are covered with cottony hair on the underside, and heads of yellowish brown flowers arranged in rounded cymes.

Description
The upper surface of the leaves is glossy dark green and the lower surface is covered with felt-like, cottony white hairs.

Taxonomy and naming
Cassinia accipitrum was first formally described in 2004 by Anthony Edward Orchard in Australian Systematic Botany from specimens collected by Obed David Evans near Colo Heights in 1960.

Distribution and habitat
This species of Cassinia grows in forest in the valleys of the Hawkesbury and Colo Rivers.

References

occipitrum
Asterales of Australia
Flora of New South Wales
Plants described in 2004